Burdon is a village and civil parish in the City of Sunderland in Tyne and Wear, England. It is south of the city centre. The north-west of the parish includes part of the Doxford Park estate. It has a population of 971. There is currently no parish council.

See also
 Great Burdon
 Burdon (music)

References

External links

Villages in Tyne and Wear
Civil parishes in Tyne and Wear
City of Sunderland